Erichthonius Discovered by the Daughters of Cecrops may refer to:
Erichthonius Discovered by the Daughters of Cecrops (Jordaens)
Erichthonius Discovered by the Daughters of Cecrops (Rubens)